Shakila Sharma (born 28 February 1962), better known as Shakila Zafar, is a Bangladeshi singer.

Early life 
Shakila was born in Karachi, Pakistan. She grew up in Pakistan with her family. Her family belongs to Sirajganj District, Bangladesh. Her father was a government employee of Pakistan. He was assigned to the Industrial Development Bank of Pakistan. In 1970, Shakila came to Bangladesh and was admitted in the Willes Little Flower School. She followed this with graduation from Dhaka University, in philosophy.

Career
Shakila's career began as a result of her appearance in the 1983 BTV program Jodi Kichu Mone Na Koren where she performed an astrology themed song "Tula Rashir Meye".

Her fifteenth album, Labonye Purno Pran, was her first solo album of Rabindra Sangeet. It contains ten songs selected and arranged by Tagore song exponent Chanchal Khan. It was recorded in Kolkata and released on the G-Series label in April 2011.

Personal life 
Shakila first married Manna Zafar. She added "Zafar" to her name after marriage. The couple has a child, but relationship with Manna broke down many years ago. In December 2015, Shakila again married an Indian poet and engineer, Ravi Sharma, who is the former CEO of Adani Power and was also CEO-South Asia at Alcatel-Lucent. After her second marriage, she changed her name to Shakila Sharma based on her current husband's name.

Bengali songs

Film songs

Television songs

Non-film songs

References

External links
 
 

1962 births
20th-century Bangladeshi women singers
20th-century Bangladeshi singers
21st-century Bangladeshi women singers
21st-century Bangladeshi singers
Living people